The 2003 Super 12 season was the eighth season of the Super 12, contested by teams from Australia, New Zealand and South Africa. The season ran from February to May 2003, with each team playing all the others once. At the end of the regular season, the top four teams entered the playoff semi finals, with the first placed team playing the fourth and the second placed team playing the third. The winner of each semi final qualified for the final, which was contested by the Blues and the Crusaders at Eden Park, Auckland. The Blues won 21 – 17 to win their third Super 12 title.

Table

Results

Round 1

Round 2

Round 3

Round 4

Round 5

Round 6

Round 7

Round 8

Round 9

Round 10

Round 11

Round 12

Finals

Semi finals

Grand final

Attendances

References

External links
2003 Super 12 season at www.rugby.com.au

2003 in South African rugby union
2003
 
 
2003 rugby union tournaments for clubs